John Warren Shipley, Baron Shipley,  (born 5 July 1946) is a British politician who has been a life peer in the House of Lords since 2010. A member of the Liberal Democrats, he previously served as leader of Newcastle City Council between 2006 and 2010.

Local government
Shipley was elected to Newcastle City Council in 1975 as a councillor, before becoming the Opposition Leader between 1988 and 1998. He became leader of the council in 2006 until 2010. In 2010, he became Vice-President of the Local Government Association (LGA).

Parliamentary elections
Shipley stood as the Liberal candidate for Blyth in the February and October general elections in 1974, then for Hexham in 1979, as well as the SDP–Liberal Alliance candidate for Newcastle upon Tyne North in the 1983 and 1987 general elections.

Peerage
In the 1995 New Year Honours Shipley was appointed an Officer of the Order of the British Empire (OBE).

He was created a life peer as Baron Shipley of Gosforth on 14 July 2010. Since becoming a peer, he was appointed as a Liberal Democrat spokesperson in Parliament, serving on the frontbench teams of Jo Swinson and Vince Cable between 2017 and 2019.

Personal life

Shipley is a supporter of Sunderland AFC.

References

External links
Liberal Democrats profile
Parliament profile

1946 births
Living people
Liberal Democrats (UK) life peers
Liberal Democrats (UK) councillors
Life peers created by Elizabeth II
Officers of the Order of the British Empire
Leaders of local authorities of England
Councillors in Newcastle upon Tyne